Charles Sidney McCarthy (born August 6, 1980) is a retired American mixed martial artist. A professional competitor from 2003 until 2008, he competed for the UFC, King of the Cage, and was a competitor on The Ultimate Fighter 4.

Mixed martial arts career 
His official UFC record is 1–2, having lost his debut to David Loiseau by TKO due to a spinning back kick at UFC 53 while defeating Gideon Ray by an armbar on The Ultimate Fighter 4 Finale, giving him his first UFC victory. McCarthy was eliminated by Pete Sell from The Ultimate Fighter 4. However, as the fight was a demonstration bout by Nevada State Athletic Commission standards, it did not count toward McCarthy's official record. McCarthy's last fight was a loss against Michael Bisping by TKO at UFC 83. McCarthy repeatedly taunted Bisping during the bout. McCarthy, however, was subsequently unable to answer the bell for the second round due to injury after a flurry of knees from Bisping at the end of round one.

McCarthy announced his retirement from mixed martial arts on April 24, 2008.

Personal life 
Charles and his ex-wife Elisa were married in September 2005, right before the filming started on The Ultimate Fighter 4. The couple have two sons, Zachary and Gavin.

Since retiring from active competition, McCarthy has opened several successful mixed martial arts schools and currently coaches at American Combat Gym. McCarthy coaches his students in competition, with Charles Rosa being notable for compiling a 15–2 amateur record and winning three amateur mixed martial arts titles and a title in Muay Thai. Rosa has since gone on to compete in the UFC.

In addition to his school, McCarthy also helped to found mixed martial arts website CageJunkies.com. CageJunkies provided news and original opinion pieces and has counted UFC veterans Ben Stark, Heath Herring, and Marcus Davis among its contributors.

In early 2012, McCarthy was also announced as a partner in Alchemist Management.

In 2014 Charles started Guardian Sports Group a UFC agency.

In 2019 Charles won the VR Pavlov League world championship, his team "thinking" went undefeated.

Mixed martial arts record 

|-
| Loss
| align=center| 10-5
| Michael Bisping
| TKO (arm injury)
| UFC 83
| 
| align=center| 1
| align=center| 5:00
| Montreal, Quebec, Canada
| 
|-
| Win
| align=center| 10-4
| Gideon Ray
| Submission (armbar)
| The Ultimate Fighter: The Comeback Finale
| 
| align=center| 1
| align=center| 4:43
| Las Vegas, Nevada, United States
| 
|-
| Loss
| align=center| 9-4
| Trevor Garrett
| Submission (guillotine choke)
| Full Throttle 4
| 
| align=center| 1
| align=center| 0:39
| Duluth, Georgia, United States
| 
|-
| Win
| align=center| 9-3
| Mike Van Meer
| Submission (armbar)
| Full Throttle 3
| 
| align=center| 2
| align=center| 4:09
| Georgia, United States
| 
|-
| Loss
| align=center| 8-3
| David Loiseau
| TKO (spinning back kick)
| UFC 53
| 
| align=center| 2
| align=center| 2:10
| Atlantic City, New Jersey, United States
| 
|-
| Win
| align=center| 8-2
| Timothy Williams
| Submission (armbar)
| Full Throttle 1
| 
| align=center| 1
| align=center| 2:33
| Georgia, United States
| 
|-
| Win
| align=center| 7-2
| Sean Sallee
| Submission (armbar)
| Absolute Fighting Championships 11
| 
| align=center| 1
| align=center| 3:03
| Fort Lauderdale, Florida, United States
| 
|-
| Win
| align=center| 6-2
| Keith Rockel
| Submission (armbar)
| Absolute Fighting Championships 10
| 
| align=center| 2
| align=center| 2:16
| Fort Lauderdale, Florida, United States
| 
|-
| Win
| align=center| 5-2
| Pat O'Malley
| Submission (rear naked choke)
| Absolute Fighting Championships 9
| 
| align=center| 1
| align=center| 2:02
| Fort Lauderdale, Florida, United States
| 
|-
| Win
| align=center| 4-2
| Jeff Fenno
| Submission (rear naked choke)
| ISCF: Throwdown in V-Town
| 
| align=center| N/A
| align=center| N/A
| Valdosta, Georgia, United States
| 
|-
| Loss
| align=center| 3-2
| David Bielkheden
| TKO (submission to punches)
| Absolute Fighting Championships 7
| 
| align=center| 1
| align=center| 3:33
| Fort Lauderdale, Florida, United States
| 
|-
| Loss
| align=center| 3-1
| Marcel Ferriera
| Decision (majority)
| KOTC 32: Bringing Heat
| 
| align=center| 2
| align=center| 5:00
| Miami, Florida, United States
| 
|-
| Win
| align=center| 3-0
| Pat O'Malley
| Submission (heel hook)
| Absolute Fighting Championships 6
| 
| align=center| 1
| align=center| 0:28
| Fort Lauderdale, Florida, United States
| 
|-
| Win
| align=center| 2-0
| Wesley Bockert
| Submission (kimura)
| ISCF: Total Velocity in the Valley
| 
| align=center| 1
| align=center| 0:31
| N/A
| 
|-
| Win
| align=center| 1-0
| Jay Massey
| Submission (kimura)
| Absolute Fighting Championships 4
| 
| align=center| 2
| align=center| 2:05
| Fort Lauderdale, Florida, United States
|

References

External links 
 
 

1980 births
Living people
American male mixed martial artists
Mixed martial artists from New York (state)
Middleweight mixed martial artists
Mixed martial artists utilizing Brazilian jiu-jitsu
Sportspeople from Boynton Beach, Florida
Ultimate Fighting Championship male fighters
American practitioners of Brazilian jiu-jitsu
People awarded a black belt in Brazilian jiu-jitsu